Paul Robert Dearing (2 March 1942 – 6 April 2015) was a field hockey player from Australia, who won the silver medal with the Men's National Team at the 1968 Summer Olympics in Mexico City. Four years earlier he captured the bronze medal. He was born in Hamilton, New South Wales, Australia.

References

External links
 
 
 

1942 births
2015 deaths
Australian male field hockey players
Olympic field hockey players of Australia
Field hockey players at the 1964 Summer Olympics
Field hockey players at the 1968 Summer Olympics
Field hockey players at the 1972 Summer Olympics
Olympic silver medalists for Australia
Olympic bronze medalists for Australia
Olympic medalists in field hockey
Medalists at the 1968 Summer Olympics
Medalists at the 1964 Summer Olympics